The brown tube-nosed bat (Murina suilla) is a species of vesper bat in the family Vespertilionidae. It can be found in the following countries: Brunei Darussalam, Indonesia, Malaysia, and the Philippines.

References

Murininae
Bats of Southeast Asia
Bats of Indonesia
Bats of Malaysia
Mammals of Borneo
Mammals of Brunei
Mammals of the Philippines
Least concern biota of Asia
Taxonomy articles created by Polbot
Mammals described in 1840
Taxa named by Coenraad Jacob Temminck